José Delicado Baeza (January 18, 1927 – March 17, 2014) was a Roman Catholic archbishop.

Ordained to the priesthood in 1951, Baeza was appointed bishop of the Roman Catholic Diocese of Tui-Vigo, Spain in 1969 and then archbishop of the Roman Catholic Archdiocese of Valladolid in 1975 and retired in 2002.

Notes

1927 births
2014 deaths
Archbishops of Valladolid